The Cotentin Donkey, is a breed of domestic donkey from the Cotentin peninsula, in the département of la Manche,   in the Lower Normandy region in north-west France. It is found mostly in that region, but is distributed through much of north-western France. It was in the past used as a pack animal in agricultural work, mainly for carrying milk churns; it is now used in leisure sports and tourism. The breed was recognised by the Ministère de l'Agriculture, the French ministry of agriculture, in 1997. The stud book is kept by the Association de l'âne du Cotentin, an association of breeders.

History 

Donkeys are documented in the Cotentin from the sixteenth century. In the 1930s there were 9000 donkeys in the département of la Manche. Numbers dwindled with the mechanisation of agriculture in the period after the Second World War, but less rapidly than in some other breeds, and in 1960 there were still 7000 in the Manche.
 
The Cotentin Donkey is raised mainly in Lower Normandy, but is also found in more than half the départements of France, mostly in the north-west. Numbers were estimated at 650–700 in 2001. In 2011 there were 107 breeders, and 140 new registrations in the stud book, approximately a quarter of all new donkey registrations in that year.

Characteristics

The coat is dove grey, with a well-defined darker dorsal stripe and shoulder-stripe; the legs may show zebra-striping. The lower part of the muzzle is grey-white, as is the belly.

Use 

Like the Norman Donkey, the Cotentin Donkey was used in agricultural work, both as a pack animal to transport churns of milk in a time when cows were milked by hand in the field, and in harness. Today it may be used as a pack animal for hiking or trekking, for recreational driving, in therapy for the handicapped, or kept as a companion animal or pet. Asses' milk is used to make cold process soap.

References 

Donkey breeds
Donkey breeds originating in France
Manche